Vivianne Miedema is a Dutch professional footballer who has played as a forward for the Netherlands women's national football team since 2013. She is the all-time top scorer for her country, for both women and men. On 26 September 2013, Miedema made her debut for the Dutch senior team aged seventeen. She was an 84th-minute substitute for Lieke Martens in a 4–0 win over Albania in the 2015 FIFA Women's World Cup qualification – UEFA Group 5. One month later in her second cap she scored her first goals, a hat-trick, in her country's 7–0 win over Portugal, after only having come onto the pitch as a substitute in the 75th minute.

Miedema helped the Dutch qualify for their first-ever FIFA World Cup finals, scoring all three of her side's goals in the two-leg final of the UEFA qualification play-offs against Italy in November 2014. She finished as the top scorer in the qualification campaign with 16 goals. At the finals in Canada, she played all four matches, three group stage games and the round of 16 match, a defeat against Japan. She did not score in Canada. At the 2017 UEFA Women's European Championship, held in the Netherlands, Miedema scored four times, including in the semi-final win over England and in the final against Denmark. Her goals helped secure the first ever title for the Dutch women.

In the 2019 FIFA Women's World Cup qualification – UEFA play-offs Miedema scored twice against Switzerland, taking her country to the World Cup finals in France, where she scored three times. On 15 June 2019, Miedema became the all-time top scorer of the Netherlands women's national football team after scoring her 60th goal in a 3–1 Group E win against Cameroon. She passed the record held by Manon Melis and extended her lead over the men's team's leading scorer, Robin van Persie, who scored 50 goals before retiring. In the quarter-final against Italy she scored the first goal of the match, helping the Dutch progress. In the final against the United States the Netherlands did not score and lost 2–0. At the 2020 Olympics in Tokyo Miedema broke the record of most goals scored in a single Olympic tournament: 10. In 115 appearances for the senior national team as of September 2022, Miedema has scored 95 goals. None of her goals have come from penalty kicks. She has scored seven hat-tricks: a double hat-trick (six goals) against Cyprus (2022), four goals against Zambia (2021), and regular hat-tricks against Greece (2013), Russia (2017), and  Portugal (twice, in 2013 and 2014). Her most productive year was 2017 with 20 goals from 21 games.

International goals
"Score" represents the score in the match after Miedema's goal. "Score" and "Result" list the Netherlands' goal tally first. Cap represents the player's appearance in an international level match at senior level.

Statistics

See also
 List of top international women's football goal scorers by country
 List of women's footballers with 100 or more international goals

References

Miedema
Miedema goals
Miedema goals
Miedema